Henderson Secondary School (Abbreviation: HSS) was a co-educational, single session, government school in Bukit Merah, Singapore and was established in 1974. It was located at 100 Henderson Road, Singapore 159544. It was closed and merged with Bukit Merah Secondary School in 2017.

History

Established
Henderson Secondary School was established in 1974 on Friendly Hill at Preston Road. There were only 600 Secondary One students with 24 teachers and was headed by Mr. Gan Kee Soon.

On 17 September 1976, the new school compound, which cost more than S$2 million to build, was officially opened by the then-Parliamentary Secretary for Home Affairs and MP for Bukit Merah, Mr. Lim Guan Hoo.

In 1994, the school shifted to a temporary holding campus in 31 Queensway to make way for the rebuilding of the campus in Henderson Road. On 8 November 1997, the school held a homecoming event where all the students and the principal took a walk from the temporary school back to the new campus.

On 17 April 1999, an opening ceremony was held at the school to officially declared open by then Mayor and MP for Tanjong Pagar GRC, Mr. Ow Chin Hock.

Merger
In 2017, Henderson Secondary was merged into Bukit Merah Secondary due to reduced enrolment in both schools.

The former premises of Henderson Secondary was, in 2018, taken over by the Singapore Land Authority (SLA) to be transformed into pre-school, nursing home and urban farm.

Principals

Identity & heritage

School song
The school song of Henderson Secondary School was composed in 1974 by Mr. Michael Habib Sim, then a Science and English teacher.

School badge
The school badge is in the shape of a shield. Within the shield, there is an open book which signifies knowledge; a flame, which Hendersonians aspire to keep ablaze; and an upright figure that represents Youth and Life.

Below the shield is the school motto: Education For Life

School colours

Cultural exchange
The school was host to twenty visiting students from Pengiran Jaya Negara Pengiran Haji Abdulud Bakar Secondary School in Brunei. 2007 was the first time that this cultural trip had taken place with secondary students.

References

External links 
 Official site
 SEAP master swimming
 SEAP masters 2015 results

Educational institutions established in 1974
1974 establishments in Singapore
Schools in Central Region, Singapore
Former secondary schools in Singapore
2017 disestablishments in Singapore
Educational institutions disestablished in 2017